Milcho Makendzhiev (born 31 October 1989) is a Bulgarian footballer, currently playing as a defender for Belasitsa Petrich. He is a central defender.

Career
In August 2007, Ascoli Calcio 1898 officially invited Makendzhiev to join the training sessions of their junior team and he went to Italy. In 2008 for four months he played and in junior team of U.S.D. Gavorrano.
In June 2008 Makendzhiev returned to Bulgaria and signed his first professional contract with Lokomotiv Mezdra. In his first season in Lokomotiv, Makendzhiev earned 14 appearances playing in A Group, scoring one goal.

From 2008 Makendzhiev played for Bulgaria national under-19 football team. He was part of the Bulgarian team that played at the 2008 UEFA European Under-19 Football Championship in the Czech Republic.

From August 2008 he is a member of Bulgaria U21.

References

External links
 

1989 births
Living people
People from Petrich
Bulgarian footballers
First Professional Football League (Bulgaria) players
PFC Lokomotiv Mezdra players
PFC Nesebar players
OFC Sliven 2000 players
FC Etar 1924 Veliko Tarnovo players
OFC Vihren Sandanski players
PFC Belasitsa Petrich players
Association football defenders
Sportspeople from Blagoevgrad Province
21st-century Bulgarian people